Jerry Hill may refer to:

 Jerry Hill (American football) (born 1939), American football running back 
 Jerry Hill (politician) (born 1947), American politician (California)
 Jerry Hill (racing driver) (born 1961), American racecar driver

See also 
 Gerald Hill (disambiguation)
 Gerry Hill (1913–2006), English cricketer
 Jeremy Hill (born 1992), American football player
 Jeremy Hill (baseball) (born 1977), American baseball player
 Hill (surname)